Mauro Benildo Bellone (born 3 July 1990) is an Argentine professional footballer who plays as a midfielder for Güemes.

Career
Colón were Bellone's first club. Bellone made two substitute appearances in both the 2008–09 and 2009–10 campaigns, before featuring eighteen times across 2010–11 while also scoring his first goal in November 2010 against Tigre. In June 2011, Bellone was loaned out to Primera B Nacional's Chacarita Juniors. Nine appearances followed as they suffered relegation. Another loan move subsequently occurred in 2012 to Instituto, where he would spend two seasons in the second tier whilst making thirty-four appearances. Further stints with Sportivo Belgrano and Deportivo Madryn then arrived for Bellone.

On 6 July 2015, Bellone joined Flandria in Primera B Metropolitana; having spent the previous five months in Torneo Federal A with Deportivo Madryn. He made his debut during a defeat away to Deportivo Español on 8 July, prior to scoring his opening Flandria goal against Fénix in the succeeding November. His second campaign with Flandria concluded with promotion as champions to Primera B Nacional. He then participated in forty-one fixtures throughout 2016–17, which was followed by twenty-three appearances as they were relegated. Bellone stayed in the division with Quilmes; signing in June 2018.

After scoring once, versus Olimpo, for Quilmes, Bellone headed to San Martín in July 2019. Fifteen appearances followed in one season with the club. In mid-2020, Bellone penned terms on a move to Cyprus with Enosis Neon Paralimni. He made his debut in a 2–0 loss away to Ethnikos Achna, playing seventy-four minutes before being replaced by Illya Markovskyy. Ahead of the 2022 season, Bellone returned to his former club San Martín de Tucumán. In June 2022, Bellone joined Güemes.

Personal life
Bellone's brother, Agustín, is a professional footballer, as is his brother-in-law Lucas Acosta.

Career statistics
.

Honours
Flandria
Primera B Metropolitana: 2016

References

External links

1990 births
Living people
Sportspeople from Santa Fe Province
Argentine footballers
Association football midfielders
Argentine expatriate footballers
Expatriate footballers in Cyprus
Argentine expatriate sportspeople in Cyprus
Argentine Primera División players
Primera Nacional players
Torneo Federal A players
Primera B Metropolitana players
Cypriot First Division players
Club Atlético Colón footballers
Chacarita Juniors footballers
Instituto footballers
Sportivo Belgrano footballers
Deportivo Madryn players
Flandria footballers
Quilmes Atlético Club footballers
San Martín de Tucumán footballers
Enosis Neon Paralimni FC players